This is a list of diplomatic missions of the Kingdom of the Netherlands, excluding honorary consulates. Ambassadors of the Netherlands are officially known as His Majesty's Ambassador Extraordinary and Plenipotentiary, with their embassies called His Majesty's Embassy accordingly. Consulates do not receive this official title.

Current missions

Africa

Americas

Asia

Europe

Oceania

Multilateral organizations

Gallery

Closed missions

Africa

Americas

Asia

Europe

See also

 Foreign relations of the Netherlands
 List of diplomatic missions in the Netherlands

Notes

References

 
Diplomatic missions
Netherlands